The 1990–91 Maltese Premier League was the 11th season of the Maltese Premier League, and the 76th season of top-tier football in Malta. It was contested by 9 teams, and Hamrun Spartans F.C. won the championship.

League standings

Results

References
Malta - List of final tables (RSSSF)

Maltese Premier League seasons
Malta
1990–91 in Maltese football